Apalus is a genus of blister beetle from the family Meloidae. The species within the genus Apalus are parasitoids of solitary bees of the families Colletidae and Anthophoridae.

Species
The following species are classified under the genus Apalus:

 Apalus bimaculatus (Linnaeus, 1761) 
 Apalus binaevus (Prochazka, 1892) 
 Apalus bipunctatus Germar, 1817 
 Apalus creticus (Frivaldsky, 1877) 
 Apalus gibbicollis Borchmann, 1910 
 Apalus guerini (Mulsant, 1858) 
 Apalus longipennis Pic, 1913 
 Apalus montanus Escherich, 1897 
 Apalus necydaleus (Pallas, 1782) 
 Apalus spectabilis E.Frivaldsky, 1835

References

Meloidae